The Panther is a 74-line alliterative poem written in the Old English language which uses the image of a panther as an allegory for Christ's death and Resurrection. It is believed to be part of a cycle of three animal-based poems called the Old English Physiologus or Bestiary, a translation-adaptation of the popular Physiologus text found in many European literatures, preserved in the Exeter Book anthology of Old English poetry. Being the first of three poems in the cycle, The Panther is followed by the poems The Whale and The Partridge.

Plot 

The poem concerns a panther who exhibits a special behaviour (sundorgecyn(e)d - a hapax legomenon compound noun from sundor- and gecynd, frequently glossed as referring to the panther's unique nature (e.g. as 'a peculiar nature' in Bosworth-Toller)). The Panther feasts on his fodder, then seeks rest in a mountain glen for the length of three days, sleeping;Symle fylle fægen, þonne foddor þigeð,æfter þam gereordum ræste seceðdygle stowe under dunscrafum;ðær se þeodwiga þreonihta fæcswifeð on swefote, slæpe gebiesgad.[Always desiring repletion,when it takes its meals—after its feasting it seeks (35-36)its rest in a secret placewithin an earthen cave—there the mighty fighter (36b-38a)for three nights’ spacewends into slumber,occupied by sleep. (38b-39)]When on the third day the Panther awakens, it begins to sing, letting out a pleasant fragrance;þonne ellenrof up astondeðþrymme gewelgad, on þone þriddan dægsneome of slæpe. Sweghleoþor cymeð,woþa wysumast þurh þæs wildres muð.æfter þære stefne stenc ut cymeðof þam wongstede, wynsumra steam[Then the bravery-bold rises up againbolstered in its majesty,on the third day, (40-41)swiftly from sleep.Melodious sound emerges,the most winsome of cries (42-43a)through that wild beast’s mouth—and after that voicea scent comes forth (43b-44)from that hollow,a pleasant emanation]The pleasant fragrance attracts many throngs of men (beornþreat monig) who flock to the source of the fragrance and song (æfter þære stefne and on þone stenc).

Themes 
The Panther's retreat and return after three nights mirrors the story of the death and resurrection of Jesus. The poem uses similar language and imagery to homiletic writings.

The word stenc (cf. Modern English stench, stink), used in The Panther to describe the fragrance the Panther exudes whilst singing, is used elsewhere in the Old English corpus as a symbol of holiness and is a key theme of the poem. The half-line þæt is æþele stenc ('that is a noble fragrance') is the last half-line of the poem, summarising the quotation attributed to St. Paul in the concluding passage of the poem;Monigfealde sind geond middangeardgod ungnyðe þe us to giefe dæleðond to feorhnere fæder ælmihtig,ond se anga hyht ealra gesceafta,uppe ge niþre." þæt is æþele stenc.[“There are many across middle-earthgracious with their goods (69-71a)which the Almighty Fathershares with us in gift and salvationand that is the solitary hope (71b-73a)of all creationabove and below.”That is a noble scent! (73b-74)]

References 

Old English poems